Kira Lipperheide (born 7 February 2000) is a German bobsledder.

She won a medal at the IBSF World Championships 2020.

References

External links

Kira Lipperheide at the German Bobsleigh, Luge, and Skeleton Federation 

2000 births
Living people
German female bobsledders
21st-century German women